Marisela Arizmedi Torres is a Mexican gymnast who won the bronze medal of artistic gymnastics at the 2007 Pan Am Games in Brazil, but had it taken away after it was established that she had the certification for a gymnastics official rather than for a competitor.

References

Living people
Year of birth missing (living people)
Mexican female artistic gymnasts
Place of birth missing (living people)
21st-century Mexican women